Cults is the debut album by American indie pop band Cults. The album was released in the US on June 7, 2011 on In the Name Of, an imprint of Columbia Records.  The album was recorded over the course of 2010 and early 2011. In early 2010, the band released an EP, which featured two of the songs to appear on the album; "Go Outside" and "Most Wanted". The song "Go Outside" was featured on the soundtrack of the game MLB 11: The Show on PlayStation 3. The song "Bad Things" also appears in the Hulu true crime drama series The Act during the end credits of the third episode "Two Wolverines", and it was sampled on the track "She Knows" by rapper J. Cole from the album Born Sinner. The song "You Know What I Mean" appears in episode 6 of Amy Poehler's show Russian Doll on Netflix.

Critical reception 

The critical reception to Cults was generally positive. Jazz Monroe of NME said "the album isn’t quite the tremulous voyage of hearts and minds it wants to be", but Hari Ashurst of the BBC said that "despite the genre signifiers there’s more than enough personality of their own here for Cults to transcend both their blog hit wonder and the timeworn sound they lovingly homage".

Pitchfork placed the album at number 46 on its list of the "Top 50 albums of 2011".

Track listing

Personnel
Cults
 Madeline Follin – vocals, production
 Brian Oblivion – guitar, keyboards, percussion, production (all tracks), background vocals (3)

Additional personnel
 Shane Stoneback – production, mixing, engineering
 Emily Lazar – mastering
 Joe LaPorta – mastering
 Ever Ronquillo – engineering assistance
 Will McLaren – bass (3), guitar (6, 8)
 Loren Humphrey – drums (3, 8)
 David Bett – art direction, design
 Jeannette Kaczorowski – art direction, design
 Eric Chakeen – cover photo
 Ben Pier – photography
 Bettman – photography
 Corbis – photography
 Steve Simon – photography

References

External links
Official website

2011 debut albums
Cults (band) albums
Columbia Records albums